Jon Charles Ratliff (born December 22, 1971) is an American former professional baseball player. Ratliff played one game in his career, for the Oakland Athletics of Major League Baseball (MLB) in the 2000 season. He pitched one inning in relief not allowing a hit or a walk, and not striking out a batter.

Career
Ratliff attended LeMoyne College. In 1992 he played collegiate summer baseball with the Hyannis Mets of the Cape Cod Baseball League and was named a league all-star. He was selected by the Chicago Cubs in the first round (24th overall) in the 1993 MLB draft. He played eight seasons in the minor leagues.

Ratliff was featured in the book 'The Cup of Coffee Club: 11 Players and Their Brush with Baseball History' (2020) by Jacob Kornhauser.

References

External links
, or Retrosheet, or Pura Pelota (Venezuelan Winter League)

1971 births
Living people
American expatriate baseball players in Canada
Baseball players from Syracuse, New York
Calgary Cannons players
Daytona Cubs players
Geneva Cubs players
Hyannis Harbor Hawks players
Iowa Cubs players
Jupiter Hammerheads players
Le Moyne Dolphins baseball players
Major League Baseball pitchers
Modesto A's players
Oakland Athletics players
Orlando Cubs players
Orlando Rays players
Richmond Braves players
Sacramento River Cats players
Syracuse SkyChiefs players
Tiburones de La Guaira players
American expatriate baseball players in Venezuela
Liverpool High School alumni